Gregory Michael (born May 30, 1981) is an American actor.

Biography
Michael was born in Philadelphia, Pennsylvania. He is the only son of Gregory Hosmer and Rosaria DiStefano, and has one older sister, Christina.   He attended the Christian Brothers' La Salle College High School, in Wyndmoor, Pennsylvania. Michael went on to college to pursue his studies in theatre and acting at Pennsylvania State University. Michael currently resides in Los Angeles, California. Although he has portrayed gay characters on multiple television shows, he is straight in his own life, and was reported to have previously dated Stephanie Pratt.

Acting career
At a young age, Michael was active in community theater, portraying lead characters in the musicals Blood Brothers, The Music Man, and Damn Yankees, which were performed at the Walnut Street Theatre in Philadelphia, Pennsylvania. In high school, he captured national championship awards in his Dramatic and Humorous Interpretation of literature, in competing with the National Forensics League, under the coaching of the late Brother Rene Sterner FSC.

Michael's first professional work was for Walt Disney Entertainment, at Walt Disney World in Orlando, Florida as a character performer. The Walt Disney World Christmas Day Parade was one of Michael's first appearances on television. Michael's notable television roles include; "Clark Watson" on the CBS soap opera As the World Turns, "Kevin Archer", in the supernatural gothic soap opera Dante's Cove, and "Grant Ellis" on ABC Family's Greek.

Filmography

Television

Film

Music videos

References

External links 
 

1981 births
American male film actors
American male soap opera actors
American male television actors
Living people
Male actors from Philadelphia